Andrzej Zgutczyński (born 1 January 1958) is a Polish former professional footballer who played as a striker.

During his club career he played for Mazur Ełk, Lech Poznań, Bałtyk Gdynia, Legia Warszawa, Górnik Zabrze, AJ Auxerre, Cercle Dijon Football, and CS Meaux. He earned 5 caps for the Poland national football team and participated in the 1986 FIFA World Cup, where Poland reached the second round.

Personal life
His brother is former footballer Dariusz Zgutczyński.

References

External links

1958 births
Living people
People from Ełk
Association football midfielders
Polish footballers
Poland international footballers
1986 FIFA World Cup players
Mazur Ełk players
Lech Poznań players
Bałtyk Gdynia players
Legia Warsaw players
Górnik Zabrze players
AJ Auxerre players
CS Meaux players
Ekstraklasa players
Ligue 1 players
Polish expatriate footballers
Expatriate footballers in France